Marilyn Roberta Sokol (born February 22, 1944) is an American actress, musician, comedian, and producer, perhaps best known for her roles as Lulu Brecht in Can't Stop the Music (1980) and as Ma Otter in Emmet Otter's Jug-Band Christmas (1977). She has received an Obie Award and a Bistro Award.

Biography
She lives in New York City and has appeared in film, television as well as in theatre on Broadway, off-Broadway and regional theatres.

Sokol was born February 22, 1944, in the Bronx, New York City, and attended Calvin Coolidge High School in Washington, D.C., and New York University. She began her professional career in 1966 as a belly dancer in the national production of Man of La Mancha. She won an Obie Award for Distinguished Performance by an Actress in 1972 for her performance in a Chelsea Theater Center production of The Beggar's Opera. In 1977, she voiced Ma Otter in Emmet Otter's Jug-Band Christmas. In 1980, she was nominated for Worst Supporting Actress at the 1st Golden Raspberry Awards for her role in Can't Stop the Music. She has worked as a comedian, singer, and cabaret performer. In 2012-2013, she starred in the off-Broadway production Old Jews Telling Jokes.  She has taught as a distinguished lecturer in the theatre program at Lehman College. She also portrayed Agnes Vertrulli on the web series Submissions Only in 2014.

Filmography

Film

Television

Notable theater productions
 Year Boston Won the Pennant (1969)
 The Great God Brown, Cybel, Dec. 10, 1972 - Jan. 13, 1973
 Don Juan, Matherine, Dec. 11, 1972 - Jan. 13, 1973
 Elephant Steps (1974) (in the role of Ragtime Lady, her performance of "Watch Me Put My Right Foot Through the Door" has been captured on the cast album)
 Welcome to the Club, Arlene Metzler, Apr. 13 - 22, 1989
Guilt Without Sex (one woman show, 1991)
 Conversations with My Father, Hannah de Blinde, Mar. 22, 1992 - Mar. 14, 1993
 Shlemiel the First (1994-1997)
 Angel Levine (1995)
 Sam and Itkeh (1997)
 If Memory Serves (1999)
 Closet Chronicles (2003)
 In the Wings (2005)
 Old Jews Telling Jokes (2013)

References

External links
 Official website
 
 
 

Living people
1937 births
Actresses from New York City
American stage actresses
New York University alumni
Lehman College faculty
American film actresses
American television actresses
Obie Award recipients
Emmy Award winners
20th-century American actresses
21st-century American actresses
American web series actresses